Gbéhoué is an arrondissement in the Mono department of Benin. It is an administrative division under the jurisdiction of the commune of Grand-Popo. According to the population census conducted by the Institut National de la Statistique Benin on February 15, 2002, the arrondissement had a total population of 4453.

References

Populated places in the Mono Department
Arrondissements of Benin